Charaxes antamboulou, the Madagascar green-veined charaxes, is a butterfly of the family Nymphalidae. The species was first described by Hippolyte Lucas in 1872. It is found in Madagascar. The habitat consists of Afrotropical forests and woodland.

The larvae feed on Croton species.

Description
Charaxes antamboulou is very similar to Charaxes candiope but has smaller upperside submarginal and marginal stains and a more marked contrast between the black apical patches and the yellow basal colour of the upperside wings.

A full description is given by Walter Rothschild and Karl Jordan, 1900 Novitates Zoologicae volume 7:287-524.  page 368-369 (for terms see Novitates Zoologicae volume 5:545-601 )

Taxonomy
Charaxes antamboulou is a member of the species group Charaxes candiope. The clade members are

Charaxes candiope nominate
Charaxes antamboulou
Charaxes cowani
Charaxes velox
Charaxes thomasius

Realm
Afrotropical realm

See also
Ecoregions of Madagascar

References

External links
Victor Gurney Logan Van Someren, 1974 Revisional notes on African Charaxes (Lepidoptera: Nymphalidae). Part IX. Bulletin of the British Museum of Natural History (Entomology) 29 (8):415-487. 
Seitz, A. Die Gross-Schmetterlinge der Erde 13: Die Afrikanischen Tagfalter. Plate XIII 32
Species info
Charaxes antamboulou images at Consortium for the Barcode of Life
African Butterfly Database Range map via search

Butterflies described in 1872
antamboulou
Endemic fauna of Madagascar
Butterflies of Africa
Taxa named by Hippolyte Lucas